Samuel Palmer FRS (1670–1738) was an early 18th century wealthy British surgeon.

Life
He was born on 5 January 1670 the son of John Palmer and his wife Alice.

He worked in St. Bartholomew's Hospital in London and served as its treasurer.

On 5 December 1728 he was elected a Fellow of the Royal Society of London.

He died in London on 20 April 1738 aged 68. His grave monument in Wandsworth Parish Church is by Peter Scheemakers.

Family
He was married to Sarah Still. They had two daughters, Frances and Elizabeth.

His daughter Frances Palmer (1689-1766) married his colleague at Bartholomew's Hospital, Sir Peter Sainthill FRS of Wandsworth.

References
 

1670 births
1738 deaths
People from Wandsworth
British surgeons
Fellows of the Royal Society